Wiesław Lendzion (born February 10, 1939) is Polish former footballer and manager who played and coached in the Ekstraklasa.

Career 
Lendzion began playing football with Huraganie Morąg in 1959. In 1961, he signed with Warmia Olsztyn where he spent four seasons. In 1965, he signed with Wisła Kraków where he played a total of 182 matches and recorded 25 goals. In 1974, he signed with rivals KS Cracovia. In 1981, he briefly coached Wisla Kraków for a season. He would return to Warmia to coach the club's youth teams.

References 

1939 births
Living people
Polish footballers
Polish football managers
Wisła Kraków players
MKS Cracovia (football) players
Wisła Kraków managers
People from Nowe Miasto Lubawskie
Association footballers not categorized by position